In supramolecular chemistry, host–guest chemistry describes complexes that are composed of two or more molecules or ions that are held together in unique structural relationships by forces other than those of full covalent bonds. Host–guest chemistry encompasses the idea of molecular recognition and interactions through non-covalent bonding. Non-covalent bonding is critical in maintaining the 3D structure of large molecules, such as proteins and is involved in many biological processes in which large molecules bind specifically but transiently to one another.

Although non-covalent interactions could be roughly divided into those with more electrostatic or dispersive contributions, there are few commonly mentioned types of non-covalent interactions: ionic bonding, hydrogen bonding, van der Waals forces and hydrophobic interactions.

Host-guest interaction has raised dramatical attention since it was discovered. It is an important field, because many biological processes require the host-guest interaction, and it can be useful in some material designs. There are several typical host molecules, such as, cyclodextrin, crown ether, et al. In this article, the author will briefly introduce some examples of the host-guest molecules, discuss the thermodynamic and kinetic parameters, and discuss some applications.

Overview
Although van de waals postulated the intermolecular interaction in 1873, in 1894, Fischer built a philosophical root for the supramolecular chemistry, as he pointed out that the enzyme-protein interaction take the form of lock and key. This is the fundamental of the host-guest chemistry. Then in 1920, Latimer and Rodebush described the hydrogen bonding. With the deeper understanding of the non-covalent interactions, for example, the clear elucidation of DNA structure, chemists started to emphasize the importance of non-covalent interactions. In 1967, Charles J. Pedersen discovered crown ether, which is a “ring-like structure”, and able to capture certain metallic atoms. The metallic atoms can be included in this organic compound. Then, in 1969, Jean-Marie Lehn found a molecule similar to crown ether, called cryptands. After that, Donald J. Cram discovered a molecule which can attach to certain atom or molecule by themselves. The three scientists were awarded the Nobel Prize in Chemistry in 1987 “for their development and use of molecules with structure-specific interactions of high selectivity”. In 2016, three other scientists, whose name are Bernard L. Feringa, Sir J. Fraser Stoddart and Jean-Pierre Sauvage, were awarded the Nobel Prize in Chemistry, "for the design and synthesis of molecular machines". This opened a gate for the supramolecular chemistry.

Supramolecular chemistry refers to the chemical systems that contains discrete number chemical components. The strengths of the systems vary from the intermolecular forces to covalent bindings. The researchers mentioned above created and enlarged the area of host-guest interaction, one of the most important concepts of the supramolecular chemistry fields. There are two significant components in the host-guest interaction. One is the "host molecules", which usually have "pore-like" structure that is able to capture some other molecules. The another one is the "guest molecules", which are generally smaller than the host molecules, and capable of binding the host molecules. The driving forces of the interaction might vary in different cases, such as hydrophobic effect, chelate effect, van der Waals force, et al. Different bindings will provide variant properties for the materials, i.e., stimuli-responsiveness, self-healing, matrix rigidification. As a consequence, the host-guest interaction can be applied for self-healing materials, stimuli-responsive materials, room-temperature phosphorescence (RTP), improvement of mechanical properties, et al. The sizes of the host and guest molecules play an essential role in the interactions, and some typical examples of the host interactions will be discussed as followed.

Host–guest chemistry is a branch of supramolecular chemistry in which a host molecule binds a so-called guest molecule or ion. The two components of the complex interact by non-covalent forces, most commonly by hydrogen-bonding. Binding between host and guest can be highly selective, in which case the interaction is called molecular recognition. Often, a dynamic equilibrium exist between the unbound and the bound states:

H ="host", G ="guest", HG ="host–guest complex"

The "host" component is often the larger molecule, and it encloses the smaller, "guest", molecule. In biological systems, the analogous terms of host and guest are commonly referred to as enzyme and substrate respectively.

Main types of macrocyclic hosts

Crown ether 

Crown ether is a ring-like structure, with several units of ethylene glycol. Because the radius of a pore is similar to that of alkali metal ion, the crown ether is well known for its ability to bind metallic ion.  For example, 12-crown-4, 15-crwon-5, 18-crown-6, 21-crown-7, and 24-crown-8 interact with potassium, sodium, ammonium, and calcium ion, respectively. Among the above crown ether, all the ions have the strongest binding affinity with 18-crown-6, for the reason that the size of 18-crown-6 matches the ions most. Besides the ion, crown ether can also bind to neutral molecules, i.e., 1, 2, 3- triazole. Since the crown ether is not fixed upon the molecular chain, it can move from one triazole unit to another one, in other words, the ring can slide across the molecular chain. This structure is called rotaxane.

Cyclodextrin 
Cyclodextrin (CD) is composed of several glucose units and connects by ether bonds. There are three kinds of CDs, α-CD (6 units), β-CD (7 units), and γ-CD (8 units). The heights of the structure are all around 8 Å, while the cavity sizes of them are different, around 5, 6, and 8 Å, respectively.  By comparing the size of the guest molecule and the CD, the binding behavior can be predicted. For instance, if the guest molecule is larger than the CD, it can be assumed that the binding will not occur. Typically, the α-CD can thread onto one PEG chain, while γ-CD can thread onto 2 PEG chains. β-CD can bind with thiophene-based molecule.

Cryptophanes 

The structure of cryptophanes contain 6 phenyl rings, mainly connected in 4 ways . Due to te phenyl group and aliphatic chain, the cage inside cryptophanes is highly hydrophobic, suggesting the capability of capturing some non-polar molecule. Based on this, cryptophanes can be employed to capture xenon in aqueous solution, which might be helpful in biological study.

Resorcinarenes and Pyrogallolarenes 
One of the classic structures of resorcinarenes and pyrogallolarenes is shown below. Because of the phenol group, some hydrogen bonds are foromed among the molecules. Sometimes, the binding ratio of the host and guest could reach 2 : 1.

Other receptors (cucurbit[n]urils, CB) 
Cucurbit[n]urils have similar size of γ-CD, which also behave similarly (i.e., 1 eq. of cucurbit[n]urils can thread onto 2 eq. PEG chains).

Thermodynamic principles of host–guest interactions
The thermodynamics of the host and guest interaction can be assessed by NMR spectroscopy, UV/visible spectroscopy, and isothermal titration calorimetry,. Quantitative analysis of binding constant values provides useful thermodynamic information.

An association constant,  can be defined by the expression

where {HG} is the thermodynamic activity of the complex at equilibrium. {H} represents the activity of the host and {G} the activity of the guest.

In practice the equilibrium constant is usually defined in terms of concentrations. 

When this definition is used, it is implied that the quotient of activity coefficients has a numerical value of one. It then appears that the equilibrium constant,  has the dimension 1/concentration, but that cannot be true since the standard Gibbs free energy change,  is proportional to the logarithm of K.

The implication is that  is regarded as having a constant value under all relevant experimental conditions. Nevertheless it is common practice to attach a dimension, such as millimole per litre or micromole per litre, to a value of K that has been determined experimentally.

A Large  value indicates that host and guest molecules interact strongly to form the host–guest complex.

Determination of binding constant values and kinetic constant

Simple host–guest complexation
When the host and guest molecules combine to form a single complex, the equilibrium is represented as

and the equilibrium constant, K, is defined as

where [X] denotes the concentration of a chemical species X (all activity coefficients are assumed to have a numerical values of 1).
The mass-balance equations, at any data point, 
 
 
where  and  represent the total concentrations, of host and guest, can be reduced to a single quadratic equation in, say, [G] and so can be solved analytically for any given value of K. The concentrations [H] and [HG] can then derived. 

The next step in the calculation is to calculate the value, of a quantity corresponding to the quantity observed . Then, a sum of squares, U, over all data points, np, can be defined as 

and this can be minimized with respect to the stability constant value, K, and a parameter such the chemical shift of the species HG (nmr data) or its molar absorbency (uv/vis data). The minimization can be performed in a spreadsheet application such as EXCEL by using the in-built SOLVER utility.

This procedure is applicable to 1:1 adducts.

Nuclear magnetic resonance (NMR) data

With nuclear magnetic resonance (NMR) spectra the observed chemical shift value, arising from a given atom contained in a reagent molecule and one or more complexes of that reagent, will be the concentration-weighted average of all shifts of those chemical species. Chemical exchange is assumed to be rapid on the NMR time-scale. 
terms of mole fractions,

This expression has the same mathematical form as Beer's law. Chemical shift values may be obtained for more than one nucleus in an analogous way that absorbance may be measured at more than one wavelength. Typical isotopes that may be used in this context are 1H,13C and 31P. It is usual to use a deuterated solvent when measuring 1H chemical shift values.

Absorbance data

It is assumed that the absorbance of each species is proportional to the concentration of that species, according to the Beer–Lambert law.

where λ is a wavelength,  is the optical path length of the cuvette which contains the solution of the N compounds (chromophores),
 is the molar absorbance (also known as the extinction coefficient) of the ith chemical species at the wavelength λ, ci is its concentration. When the concentrations have been calculated as above and absorbance has been measured for samples with various concentrations of host and guest, the Beer–Lambert law provides a set of equations, at a given wavelength, that which can be solved by a linear least-squares process for the unknown extinction coefficient values at that wavelength.

Fluorescence data
The treatment of this type of data is similar to the treatment of absorbance data. In fact the equation defining the relation between fluorescent intensity and species' concentrations is very similar. 

where  is the fluorescent intensity of the ith species at unit concentration.

Calorimetry
The heat evolved when an aliquot of host solution is added to a solution containing the guest is the sum of contributions from each reaction

If the equilibrium constant values are known, the standard enthalpy change may be calculated by a linear least-squares process, otherwise a non-linear method of data-fitting must be used.

Isothermal titration calorimetry is commonly used to determine the values of both an equilibrium constant and the corresponding standard reaction enthalpy. The manufactures of ITC instruments supply some software with which these quantities may be obtained from experimental data values.

General complexation reaction
For each equilibrium involving a host, H, and a guest G

the equilibrium constant, is defined as 
 
 
 
The relationship between a species' concentration and the measured quantity is specific for the measurement technique, as indicated in each section above. Using this relationship, the set of parameters, the stability constant values and values of properties such as molar absorptivity or specified chemical shifts, may be refined by a non-linear least-squares refinement process. For a more detailed exposition of the theory see Determination of equilibrium constants. 
Some dedicated computer programs are listed at Implementations.

Kinetic parameters 
The binding process is reversible, indicating that the associate constant (ka) is not far larger than disassociate constant (kd). Combing the rate of the reaction, ka, kd, concentration, and time, the relation of the free guest molecule and time can be calculated. By calculating the integration of UV spectrum or NMR, the concentration as a function of time curve can be obtained.

Cooperativity
In cooperativity, the initial ligand binding affects the host's affinity for subsequent ligands. In positive cooperativity, the first binding event enhances the affinity of the host for another ligand. Examples of positive and negative cooperativity are hemoglobin and aspartate receptor, respectively.

The thermodynamic properties of cooperativity have been studied in order to define mathematical parameters that distinguish positive or negative cooperativity. The traditional Gibbs free energy equation states: . However, to quantify cooperativity in a host–guest system, the binding energy needs to be considered. The schematic on the right shows the binding of A, binding of B, positive cooperative binding of A–B, and lastly, negative cooperative binding of A–B. Therefore, an alternate form of the Gibbs free energy equation would be

where:
 = free energy of binding A
 = free energy of binding B
 = free energy of binding for A and B tethered
 = sum of the free energies of binding

If  is less, then it is negatively cooperative.
Host–guest chemistry is not limited to receptor-lingand interactions. It is also demonstrated in ion-pairing systems. Such interactions are studied in an aqueous media utilizing synthetic organometallic hosts and organic guest molecules. For example, a poly-cationic receptor containing copper (the host) is coordinated with molecules such as tetracarboxylates, tricarballate, aspartate, and acetate (the guests). This study illustrates that entropy rather than enthalpy determines the binding energy of the system leading to negative cooperativity. The large change in entropy originates from the displacement of solvent molecules surrounding the ligand and the receptor. When multiple acetates bind to the receptor, it releases more water molecules to the environment than a tetracarboxylate. This led to a decrease in free energy implying that the system is cooperating negatively. In a similar study, utilizing guanidinium and Cu(II) and polycarboxylate guests, it is demonstrated that positive cooperatively is largely determined by enthalpy. In addition to thermodynamic studies, host–guest chemistry also has biological applications.

Applications

Self-healing 

Because of the non-covalent host-guest interaction, the polymer backbone can have enough flexibility to diffuse. If a crack exists in the materials, after compressing the two materials around the crack, because of the fast exchange of the host-guest molecular structure, the crack will rejoin again revealing good self-healing properties. Harada et al reported a self-healing hydrogel constructed by vinyl-group-modified cyclodextrin and adamantane. Another strategy is to use the interaction between the polymer backbone and host molecule (host molecule threading onto the polymer). If the threading process is fast enough, self-healing can also be achieved.

Room-Temperature Phosphorescence 
Generally, it is not easy to achieve pure organic phosphorescence, partly because of the instability of the triplet state (easily be quenched by moisture, oxygen, etc). Host-guest structures can provide a rigid matrix, which protects the triplet state from being quenched. In this circumstance, α-CD and CB could be used, in which the phosphor is served as a guest to interact with the host. For example, 4-phenylpyridium derivatives interacted with CB, and copolymerize with acrylamide. The resulting polymer yielded ~2 s of phosphorescence lifetime. Additionally, Zhu et al used crown ether and potassium ion to modify the polymer, and enhance the emission of phosphorescence.

Stimuli-responsive materials 
Some guest molecules are charged compounds, which might be oxidized or reduced by certain chemicals. This type of guest molecule can present redox responsiveness. Some host molecules (i.e., α-CD) or guest molecules (i.e., tetra ammonium ion) are pH-sensitive, different pH can result in different species, which significantly influences the binding behavior, giving the material pH responsive properties. Some guest molecules may change their configurations under different lights, which makes the material photo-responsive. Cai et al employed a halogen bond to prepare a host-guest system, and the materials are heat- and mechano-responsive with long persistent emission.

Encryption 
An encryption system constructed by pillar[5]arene, spiropyran and pentanenitrile (free state and grafted to polymer) was constructed by Wang et al. After UV irradiation, spiropyran would transform into merocyanine. When the visible light is was shined on the material, the merocyanine close to the pillar[5]arene-free pentanenitrile complex had faster transformation to spiropyran; on the contrary, the one close to pillar[5]arene-grafted pentanenitrile complex has much slower transformation rate. This spiropyran-merocyanine transformation can be used for message encryption. Another strategy is based on the metallacages and polycyclic aromatic hydrocarbons. Because of the fluorescnece emission differences between the complex and the cages, the information could be encrypted.

Mechanical property 
Although some host-guest interactions are not strong, increasing the amount of the host-guest interaction can improve the mechanical properties of the materials. As an example, threading the host molecules onto the polymer is one of the commonly used strategies for increasing the mechanical properties of the polymer. It takes time for the host molecules to de-thread from the polymer, which can be a way of energy dissipation. Another method is to use the slow exchange host-guest interaction. Though the slow exchange improves the mechanical properties, simultaneously, self-healing properties will be sacrificed.

Sensing
Traditionally, chemical sensing has been approached with a system that contains a covalently bound indicator to a receptor though a linker. Once the analyte binds, the indicator changes color or fluoresces. This technique is called the indicator-spacer-receptor approach (ISR). In contrast to ISR, indicator-displacement assay (IDA) utilizes a non-covalent interaction between a receptor (the host), indicator, and an analyte (the guest). Similar to ISR, IDA also utilizes colorimetric (C-IDA) and fluorescence (F-IDA) indicators. In an IDA assay, a receptor is incubated with the indicator. When the analyte is added to the mixture, the indicator is released to the environment. Once the indicator is released it either changes color (C-IDA) or fluoresces (F-IDA).

IDA offers several advantages versus the traditional ISR chemical sensing approach. First, it does not require the indicator to be covalently bound to the receptor. Secondly, since there is no covalent bond, various indicators can be used with the same receptor. Lastly, the media in which the assay may be used is diverse.

Chemical sensing techniques such as C-IDA have biological implications. For example, protamine is a coagulant that is routinely administered after cardiopulmonary surgery that counter acts the anti-coagulant activity of herapin. In order to quantify the protamine in plasma samples, a colorimetric displacement assay is used. Azure A dye is blue when it is unbound, but when it is bound to herapin, it shows a purple color. The binding between Azure A and heparin is weak and reversible. This allows protamine to displace Azure A. Once the dye is liberated it displays a purple color. The degree to which the dye is displaced is proportional to the amount of protamine in the plasma.

F-IDA has been used by Kwalczykowski and co-workers to monitor the activities of helicase in E.coli. In this study they used thiazole orange as the indicator. The helicase unwinds the dsDNA to make ssDNA. The fluorescence intensity of thiazole orange has a greater affinity for dsDNA than ssDNA and its fluorescence intensity increases when it is bound to dsDNA than when it is unbound.

Conformational switching
A crystalline solid has been traditionally viewed as a static entity where the movements of its atomic components are limited to its vibrational equilibrium. As seen by the transformation of graphite to diamond, solid to solid transformation can occur under physical or chemical pressure. It has been proposed that the transformation from one crystal arrangement to another occurs in a cooperative manner. Most of these studies have been focused in studying an organic or metal-organic framework. In addition to studies of macromolecular crystalline transformation, there are also studies of single-crystal molecules that can change their conformation in the presence of organic solvents. An organometallic complex has been shown to morph into various orientations depending on whether it is exposed to solvent vapors or not.

Environmental applications
Host guest systems have been utilized to remove hazardous materials from the environment. They can be made in different sizes and different shapes to trap a variety of chemical guests. One application is the ability of p-tert-butycalix[4]arene to trap a cesium ion. Cesium-137 is radioactive and there is a need to remove it from nuclear waste in an efficient manner. Host–guest chemistry has also been used to remove carcinogenic aromatic amines, and their N-nitroso derivatives from water. These waste materials are used in many industrial processes and found in a variety of products such as: pesticides, drugs, and cosmetics.

References

Supramolecular chemistry
Equilibrium chemistry